Miloslav Příhoda Jr. (born 23 June 1990) is a Czech equestrian. He competed in the individual eventing at the 2020 Summer Olympics.

References

External links
 

1990 births
Living people
Czech male equestrians
Olympic equestrians of the Czech Republic
Equestrians at the 2020 Summer Olympics
People from Kutná Hora
Event riders
Sportspeople from the Central Bohemian Region